William Foster "Skip" Butler (born October 21, 1947) is a former professional American football placekicker in the National Football League. He was drafted by the Green Bay Packers in the 4th round, with the 96th overall pick in the 1970 NFL Draft. He played seven seasons for the New Orleans Saints, New York Giants, and Houston Oilers.

1947 births
Living people
People from Gladewater, Texas
Players of American football from Texas
American football placekickers
Texas–Arlington Mavericks football players
New Orleans Saints players
New York Giants players
Houston Oilers players